Azerbaijanis in Turkey are Turkish citizens and permanent residents of ethnic Azerbaijani background. It is difficult to determine the exact number of ethnic Azerbaijanis currently residing in Turkey since ethnicity is a rather fluid concept in Turkish culture. According to some estimates, there are currently around 800,000 Twelver Shias in Turkey, however this figure may differ substantially from the real one. Beside the Turkish-Azerbaijanis, there are up to 300,000 of Azerbaijani citizens who reside in Turkey. They are currently the largest ethnic group in the city of Iğdır and second largest ethnic group in Kars, where they constitute majority in the district of Akyaka.

History
Azerbaijanis first settled in what is now Turkey during the period of Safavi governance over Kars and neighbouring areas. Their numbers grew during the first half of the nineteenth century, when following the Russo-Persian War (1804–1813), the Russo-Persian War (1826–1828) and the respectively out coming Gulistan and Turkmenchay treaties between Persia and Russia, Persia was forced to cede sovereignty over the khanates of Karabakh (1813), Nakhchivan (1828) and Erivan (1828), among others to Russia, and the Treaty of Adrianople gave Christians and Muslims the right to choose a place of residence between Russia and Turkey. Similarly to those of the North Caucasus, large groups of local Muslim population refused to live within Russian boundaries and migrated to Turkey (or Iran) settling in its eastern regions, especially in the Şenkaya district of Erzurum and the Taşlıçay district of Ağrı. The Turkish dialect of Erzurum has been grammatically influenced by the Azerbaijani language. Phonemic analyses indicate that Azerbaijani-influenced dialects are spoken as far as Elâzığ and Van's Erciş district.

In 1813, a group of Azerbaijanis from Karabakh settled in Aziziye, in the southern part of the Afyon Province. Today their descendants live in the villages of Büyük Karabağ and Orta Karabağ and have recently reestablished cultural ties with their historical homeland through the Turkish International Cooperation and Development Agency. Despite having undergone major assimilation in their language and religious beliefs, they still identify themselves as Karabağlı and are viewed as a distinct group by the local population. A different branch of the same group settled in Iğdır. Caferoğlu argues that the Afyon group may have left Karabakh for Turkey much earlier, in 1578, fighting for the Ottoman Empire in the Second Ottoman–Safavid War.

In addition, in the early nineteenth century, several Sunni families from Shirvan, particularly from Agsu, settled in Amasya, where for a long time they were known as Şirvanlı. In 1894, a unique baroque-style mosque was built here by Şeyh Hacı Mahmut Efendi. The mosque has been known as the Şirvanlı Mosque or the Azerîler Mosque. The descendants of those migrants nowadays live in six villages of Amasya's Suluova and Merzifon districts and have preserved their Azerbaijani identity and culture. Another group of Azerbaijanis from Shaki relocated to Bursa in 1863.

The next wave of Azerbaijani immigration to eastern Turkey took place in 1918–1925, when many Muslim residents of then newly independent Armenia fled their homes, escaping massacres by armed bands of Armenian nationalists. In 1941, already 5,000 Azerbaijanis lived in 60 villages along the Turkish bank of the Arpaçay. They were followed by former members of the overthrown government of the Democratic Republic of Azerbaijan and their families, as well as many upper-class Azerbaijanis, who fled to Turkey in fear of persecution by the Bolsheviks and settled primarily in Istanbul, Bursa and Ankara. Together with other political immigrants from the Caucasus and led by members of the deposed democratic government of Azerbaijan such as Rasulzadeh, Khasmammadov and Sultanov, some of them engaged in anti-Soviet political propaganda and activities in Turkey in an attempt to restore the independence of the Bolshevik-occupied Caucasus states. The signing of Soviet-Turkish non-aggression pacts in 1925 and 1935 created obstacles in continuing this activity in the form of arrests and bans on the publishing of anti-Soviet periodicals. This forced some politically active members of the movement to relocate to Germany and Poland by the late 1930s.

After the failure of the USSR-created regional Azerbaijan People's Government in 1946, ethnic Azerbaijani political immigrants from Iran increased the numbers of Azerbaijanis in Turkey. By 1990, about 400,000 Azerbaijanis lived in a belt of land on the Turkish side of the Soviet border. Iranian Azerbaijanis have emigrated and resettled in large numbers in Istanbul, and many Iranian Azerbaijani students who came to study in Turkey have stayed there after the completion of their studies.

Finally, starting from the early 1990s tens of thousands of immigrants from the newly independent Azerbaijan have made their way to Turkey due to economic reasons, settling mostly in big cities. According to the Turkish Ministry of the Interior, between 2003 and 2013 alone over 15,000 immigrants from Azerbaijan received Turkish citizenship. In addition, as of 2019, there were 36,543 citizens of Azerbaijan residing in Turkey.

The Terekeme people are often considered a sub-ethnic group of Azerbaijanis of Sunni Muslim background.

In general, the Azerbaijani population in Turkey is considered well-integrated into Turkish society, mainly due to cultural and linguistic affinities between Azerbaijanis and Turks. Nevertheless, differences still remain in the areas of religion (Azerbaijanis are mainly Shi'a, whereas Turks are mostly Sunni), dialect, and self-conception in terms of historical memory and ethnic/national consciousness. In 2011, Sinan Oğan, an ethnic Azerbaijani and a diaspora activist from Iğdır, won a seat in the Turkish parliament as a Nationalist Movement Party candidate. Following the June 2015 election, Kıznaz Türkeli from the Peoples' Democratic Party, another ethnic Azerbaijani, was elected to represent the same province.

Notable people

Adem Kılıççı, boxer
Aghasi Mammadov, boxer
Ali Özgündüz, former public attorney and politician
Süreyya Ağaoğlu, first female lawyer in Turkish history
Cem Karaca, musician (Azerbaijani father)
Haydar Hatemi, Turkish-Iranian Azerbaijani artist
Samin Baghtcheban, Turkish-Iranian Azerbaijani musician, composer, author and translator
Elnara Kerimova, Azerbaijani and Turkish conductor and chorus master.
Melahat Abbasova, Turkish actress and producer
Sinan Şamil Sam, Turkish-German boxer 
Hafız Süleymanoğlu, Weightlifting, World and European Champion
Rasim Başak, basketball player
Servet Tazegül — 2012 Olympic gold medal winner
Servet Çetin, football player
Sinan Oğan, politician
Tamer Karadağlı, Turkish actor
Alihan Samedov, master player of instruments (balaban, clarinet, tutek, oboe, saxophone), chess master
Mubariz Mansimov, businessman, billionaire, and founder of Palmali Group of Companies
Telman Ismailov, businessman, billionaire, and founder of AST Group of Companies
 Samad bey Rafibeyli, Turkish army general
Ahmet Ağaoğlu, Azerbaijani and Turkish publicist and journalist
Nesrin Javadzadeh, actress
Nuri Berköz, Lt.General, General Commander of Turkish Gendarmerie
Nuri Saryal, scientist, engineer
Aref Ghafouri, Illusionist
Yaşar Karadağ, politician

See also
 Azerbaijan–Turkey relations
 Demographics of Turkey
 Minorities in Turkey
 Turks in Azerbaijan

Notes and references 

 
Ethnic groups in Turkey
Azerbaijani diaspora